Li Xiaoping is a male Chinese gymnast. He competed at the 1984 Olympic Games, and won a silver medal in Men's Team. In the 1983 World Championships, he won a gold medal for Men's Team and pommel horse. After the olympics, Xiaoping attended California State University, Fullerton and became the national pommel horse champion in the 1987 NCAA Men's Gymnastics Championships.

References

Chinese male artistic gymnasts
Olympic silver medalists for China
Living people
Olympic medalists in gymnastics
Asian Games medalists in gymnastics
Gymnasts at the 1982 Asian Games
Asian Games gold medalists for China
Medalists at the 1982 Asian Games
Universiade medalists in gymnastics
Year of birth missing (living people)
Olympic gymnasts of China
Universiade gold medalists for China
Gymnasts at the 1984 Summer Olympics
Medalists at the 1984 Summer Olympics
Medalists at the 1981 Summer Universiade
20th-century Chinese people